The nuclear program of the Republic of China can be represented as a Timeline of the Taiwan-based Republic of China's nuclear program.

See also 
 Taiwan and weapons of mass destruction

References 

Nuclear technology in Taiwan
Nuclear weapons program of the Republic of China
Military history of Taiwan